Vaccination in Brazil includes all the practice and social issues related to vaccines in Brazil.

The National Program for Immunization (Programa Nacional de Imunizações, or PNI) of the Unified Health System is the national government agency overseeing vaccination in Brazil. Historically coverage has been high, reaching a national rate higher than 90%.

Brazil has an established pool of scientists and doctors who are prepared to do vaccine research and development. The COVID-19 pandemic in Brazil had the effect of providing Brazil an opportunity to conduct some of the world's most important COVID-19 vaccine research.

As of November 2021, Brazil has the lowest level of vaccine hesitancy in Latin America. Experts ascribe this to long-standing vaccination programs run by the public health system and to the inclusion of a vaccination requirement in social welfare programs. At the same time, vaccination coverage has been decreasing since 2011, mainly among rural families and people with low education.

Routine vaccinations
Vaccination coverage includes
For children

BCG vaccine, Intradermal, at birth
Hepatitis B vaccine, at birth, 1 and 6 months
Pentavalent vaccine, DTP (whole cell pertussis component), HB, and Hib, administered at 2, 4, and 6 months, with a booster (DTP) at 15 months and 4 years.
Polio vaccine (inactivated), at 2 and 4 months
Polio vaccine (oral), at 6 and 15 months
Rotavirus vaccine (monovalent oral human rotavirus vaccine) at 2 and 4 months
Pneumococcal vaccine 10-valent conjugate vaccine d at 2, 4, 6, and 10 months
Yellow fever vaccine at 9 months and booster every 10 years
MMR vaccine at 12 months and 4 years
Meningococcal vaccine at 3, 5, and 15 months
Influenza vaccine, annually
MMRV vaccine, after 1 year of age
Hepatitis A vaccine, at 0 and 6 to 12 months

For adults:

Seasonal influenza vaccines are freely available once a year for those above 60 years of age, first responders, security personnel, postpartum women and to those with select health conditions. Adults also have access to the Hepatitis B, human papillomavirus (HPV), and Yellow Fever vaccines.

Economics
Since 2008 there has been much more research in Brazil on the economic costs and benefits of vaccination programs. A 2014 study found favorable benefits of the HPV vaccine in Brazil while also explaining that economically the consequences are not simple to explain. A 2012 study considered the financial costs and health benefits of providing hepatitis A vaccines nationally to children in Brazil.

Other issues
A 2020 review of social research on vaccination in Latin America found that about half of the research papers were about Brazil.

A review of meningococcal vaccine use in Brazil from 2005 to 2017 found that the vaccination program lowered the number of cases of the disease while also the number of deaths from the disease did not change much.

In 2018 Brazil began a large campaign to provide about 70 million people with the yellow fever vaccine.

References

External links
Travel Health Notices - Brazil from the Centers for Disease Control

Healthcare in Brazil
Brazil